Thomas Joiner is an American academic psychologist and leading expert on suicide. He is the Robert O. Lawton Professor of Psychology at Florida State University, where he operates his Laboratory for the Study of the Psychology and Neurobiology of Mood Disorders, Suicide, and Related Conditions. He is author of Why People Die by Suicide (Harvard University Press 2005) and Myths about Suicide (Harvard University Press 2010), and the current editor-in-chief of Suicide and Life Threatening Behavior.

In Why People Die by Suicide, Joiner posits the interpersonal theory of suicide, a three-part explanation of suicide which focuses on ability and desire. The desire to die by suicide comes from a sense of disconnection from others and lack of belonging, combined with a belief that one is a burden on others. The ability to die by suicide comes from a gradual desensitization to violence and a decreased fear of pain, combined with technical competence in one or more suicide methods. Under this model, a combination of desire and ability will precede most serious suicide attempts.

Joiner holds a Ph.D. from the University of Texas at Austin.

References

External links
 Myths about Suicide, from Harvard University Press
 Florida State University faculty profile
 Lab Webpage

Living people
University of Texas at Austin alumni
Florida State University faculty
21st-century American psychologists
1965 births
Suicidologists
Academic journal editors
20th-century American psychologists